Agkistrodon laticinctus, commonly known as the broad-banded copperhead, is a venomous pit viper species, formerly considered a subspecies of Agkistrodon contortrix, which is found in the southern United States, from Kansas, through Oklahoma and throughout central Texas.

Description

This form is typically a light tan in color, with darker brown, wide crossbands - which gives it its common name. The actual color varies, by locality, from a red-brown, to a gray-brown.  It overlaps with the southern copperhead, A. contortrix in the eastern reaches of its range, making specimens there difficult to distinguish, but generally A. contortrix has banding that narrows at the spine, creating hourglass shapes, whereas A. laticinctus has bands that do not narrow at the spine. They grow to approximately 20-36 inches (50–90 cm) in length. As juveniles, all species of Agkistrodon have a bright green-yellow color to their tail tips, believed to be used as a lure to attract prey items to approach within striking range. The color fades to a grey or brown at about a year of age.

Common names
Common names for this species include: broad-banded copperhead, copperhead moccasin, copperhead snake, dry-land moccasin, highland moccasin, moccasin, rattlesnake pilot, red eye, Texas copperhead and thunder snake.

Geographic range
Agkistrodon laticinctus is known to populate the region between 97 degrees and 99 degrees west longitude, from Central Texas north to the southern border of Kansas and Oklahoma.

Behavior
Secretive and nocturnal, it prefers lightly wooded habitats, typically with a good amount of ground debris for cover, not far from a permanent water source. It typically avoids regions with a significant population of humans. It is an ambush predator, eating rodents, birds, lizards, anurans, and certain insects, with juveniles in particular having a taste for various kinds of insects, such as cicadas. Wide foraging of caterpillars has also been documented in the field. They are ovoviviparous, giving birth to a litter of up to eight young in the early fall.

Venom
Like most pit viper species, A. laticinctus has a hemotoxic venom, which is delivered through hinged, hollow fangs set in the front of their jaws. The fangs work like hypodermic needles, injecting the venom in a single, quick striking motion. Copperhead venom is not considered to be life-threatening to an otherwise healthy adult, but it can cause localized swelling, necrosis, and severe pain. Any bite from a venomous snake should be considered serious and medical treatment sought. There is no antivenin specifically manufactured for copperheads. However, CroFab, which makes use of the venom from the cottonmouth (Agkistrodon piscivorus), can be used in cases of a severe envenomation.

Gallery

References

External links
 
 Agkistrodon contortrix at University of Texas. Accessed 7 December 2007.
 Agkistrodon at Department of Biology, Southeastern Louisiana University, Hammond, LA70402. Accessed 15 June 2021.

contortrix laticinctus
Reptiles of the United States